Drbetinci ( or ) is a settlement in the Municipality of Sveti Andraž v Slovenskih Goricah in northeastern Slovenia. It lies in the foothills of the Slovene Hills, just north of Vitomarci. The area is part of the traditional region of Styria. It is now included with the rest of the municipality in the Drava Statistical Region.

Notable people
Notable people that were born or lived in Drbetinci include:
Ivan Jurančič (1861–1935), beekeeper

References

External links
Drbetinci at Geopedia

Populated places in the Municipality of Sveti Andraž v Slovenskih Goricah